Marcet Island is an uninhabited island within the Arctic Archipelago in the Kitikmeot Region, Nunavut. It is located in Bathurst Inlet. Other islands in the vicinity include Galena Island, Ekalulia Island, Lewes Island, Patsy Klengenberg Island, Iglorua Island, and Walrus Island.

References 

Islands of Bathurst Inlet
Uninhabited islands of Kitikmeot Region